Treasury Police may refer to:

 United States Treasury Police
 United States Mint Police
 Treasury Police (El Salvador)
 Guardia de Hacienda (Guatemala)